West Rounton Gates railway station, was a railway station between  and Picton railway stations on the Leeds Northern Railway in the Hambleton District of North Yorkshire, England. The station was opened in 1864, but it was served by trains on Wednesdays only for the market day in Stockton-on-Tees.

History
Whilst the two stations either side of West Rounton Gates were opened with the line, West Rounton itself did not appear in timetables until May 1864. The Railway Clearing Handbook shows the station being only equipped to handle passengers, and mapping from 1911 does not show any goods sidings. The station was only used on Wednesdays, when those living in the area could travel to Stockton-on-Tees for the local market.

The station was closed completely in September 1939. Whilst the date is significant for the Second World War, it was not listed as one of the stations closed by the LNER as an economy measure.

The level crossing and line are still open.

Services
The 1866 timetable shows that two early morning trains stopped on their way north, and two returns in an afternoon on Wednesdays only.

Though the station is listed in the index for the 1944 timetable, no services show calling there. Some timetables referred to the station as West Rounton Gate until around 1903–1904.

References

External links
Heritage Gateway listing

Disused railway stations in North Yorkshire
Railway stations in Great Britain opened in 1864
Railway stations in Great Britain closed in 1939
Former North Eastern Railway (UK) stations
1864 establishments in England